Germania Antiqua is the title of a 1616 work by Philipp Clüver.

Germania  (also sometimes called Germania Antiqua) was a short-lived Roman province
for the duration of 16 years under Augustus, from  7 BC to AD 9. The possible capital of this province was Marktbreit, a castrum (Roman legionary fortification) with a nearby canaba (Roman vicus) from the period of Emperor Augustus, located 70 km east of the "Limes Germanicus" on the River Main.

History

The Romans under Augustus began to conquer and defeat the peoples of Germania Magna in 12 BC, having the legati (generals) Drusus and Tiberius leading the legions. By AD 6, all of Germania up to the River Elbe was temporarily pacified by the Romans as well as being occupied by them, with Publius Quinctilius Varus being (unofficially) appointed as Germania's governor. 

 
However, the Roman plan to complete the conquest and incorporate all of Magna Germania into the Roman Empire was frustrated when three Roman legions under Varus command were annihilated by the German tribesmen in the Battle of the Teutoburg Forest in AD 9. Augustus then ordered Roman withdrawal from Magna Germania (completed by AD 16) and established the boundary of the Roman Empire as being the Rhine and the Danube. 

Under Emperors Vespasian and Domitian, the Roman Empire occupied the region known as the Agri Decumates between the Main, Danube, and Rhine rivers. The region soon became a vital part of the Limes Germanicus with dozens of Roman forts. The Agri Decumates were finally abandoned to the Germanic Alemanni, after the Emperor Probus' death (282). Some parts of the earlier province were incorporated into either Germania Inferior or Germania Superior in AD 85.

In Tacitus, Germania Antiqua or Germania Barbara, are synonyms of Germania Transrhenana, also Germania Magna, i.e., the part of Germania on the right side of the Rhine.

See also
Germani cisrhenani

Notes

Bibliography
Carroll, Maureen. Romans, Celts & Germans: the german provinces of Rome. Tempus Series. Publisher Tempus, 2001 
Lintott, Andrew. The Cambridge Ancient History: X, The Augustan Empire; 43 B.C. - A.D. 69. 10 (2nd ed.). Cambridge University Press. pp. 526–528. Cambridge, 1996 .
Mommsen, Theodore. The Provinces of the Roman Empire. Editor Scribner. New York, 1906

Germany in the Roman era